Dean Edwards (born July 30, 1970) is an American stand-up comedian, actor, writer, singer, and musician. His work as a voice actor includes Scottie Pippen and Spike Lee in Celebrity Deathmatch, a robot in Robotomy, and Donkey in Scared Shrekless after Eddie Murphy was unable to reprise the role (Edwards had impersonated Murphy on stage). He also appeared in Saturday Night Live Weekend Update Halftime Special as Savion Glover and Don Cheadle,  in Tony N' Tina's Wedding as Father Mark, and The Sopranos.

Edwards has a YouTube channel,  "deanedwardscomedy". He was also the host of the critically acclaimed TV show "Vidiots" on TVone.

Career

Stand-up comedy
Edwards developed a reputation for working clean and taught classes in stand-up comedy technique.

Voiceover work
Edwards is also a voice artist, having done voice work for Celebrity Deathmatch and Robotomy. He also did voice work for the audiobook version of Max Brooks' World War Z: An Oral History of the Zombie War.

In the 2010 Halloween special Scared Shrekless, he provided the voice of Donkey after Eddie Murphy declined; as Donkey, Edwards impersonated Murphy's vocal characterisation. Soon, Edwards got replaced himself when Eddie Murphy returned to play Donkey in the 2010 Christmas special Donkey's Christmas Shrektacular.

Writing career
Edwards was hired as a staff writer for Daily Comedy, a website where professional and amateur stand-up comedians would post new jokes frequently.

Commercials
Edwards has also appeared in commercials for Snickers and Ford.

Saturday Night Live
Edwards joined the cast of Saturday Night Live in 2001. He developed several impressions, including Michael Jackson, Wayne Brady, Chris Tucker, Don Cheadle, Colin Powell, Serena Williams, Nipsey Russell, Grace Jones, Randy Jackson, Redman, Denzel Washington, and Billy Ocean. Despite his penchant for impressions, Edwards didn't get much screen time in his brief tenure on the show. He left after the show's 28th season (2003), citing creative differences.

In Saturday Night Live Weekend Update Halftime Special, he did impressions of Savion Glover and Don Cheadle.

Filmography

Film

Television

Television

As himself

References

External links
 Official website
 

1970 births
Living people
American stand-up comedians
American male writers
American male voice actors
American male film actors
American male television actors
United States Army soldiers
American Internet celebrities
American television personalities
Male television personalities
American impressionists (entertainers)
African-American male actors
American sketch comedians
21st-century American singers
21st-century American comedians
21st-century American male singers
20th-century African-American male singers
21st-century African-American male singers